Clytiomya sola is a European species of fly in the family Tachinidae.

Distribution
Northern Mediterranean area, Transcaucasia and Israel.

References

Phasiinae
Diptera of Europe
Insects described in 1861
Taxa named by Camillo Rondani